Piero della Francesca (– 12 October 1492) was an Italian painter of the Early Renaissance. To contemporaries he was also known as a mathematician and geometer. Nowadays Piero della Francesca is chiefly appreciated for his art. His painting is characterized by its serene humanism, its use of geometric forms and perspective. His most famous work is the cycle of frescoes The History of the True Cross in the church of San Francesco in the Tuscan town of Arezzo.

Biography

Early years
Piero was born Piero di Benedetto in the town of Borgo Santo Sepolcro, modern-day Tuscany, to Benedetto de' Franceschi, a tradesman, and Romana di Perino da Monterchi, members of the Florentine and Tuscan Franceschi noble family. His father died before his birth, and he was called Piero della Francesca after his mother, who was referred to as "la Francesca" due to her marriage into the Franceschi family (similar to how Lisa Gherardini became known as "la Gioconda" through her marriage into the Giocondo family). Romana supported his education in mathematics and art.

He was most probably apprenticed to the local painter Antonio di Giovanni d'Anghiari, because in documents about payments it is noted that he was working with Antonio in 1432 and May 1438. He certainly took notice of the work of some of the Sienese artists active in San Sepolcro during his youth; e.g. Sassetta. In 1439 Piero received, together with Domenico Veneziano, payments for his work on frescoes for the church of Sant'Egidio in Florence, now lost. In Florence he must have met leading masters like Fra Angelico, Luca della Robbia, Donatello, and Brunelleschi. The classicism of Masaccio's frescoes and his majestic figures in the Santa Maria del Carmine were for him an important source of inspiration. Dating of Piero's undocumented work is difficult because his style does not seem to have developed over the years.

Mature work
Piero returned to his hometown in 1442 and was elected to the City Council of Sansepolcro. Three years later, he received his first commission, to paint the Madonna della Misericordia altarpiece for the church of the Misericordia in Sansepolcro, which was completed in the early 1460s. In 1449 he executed several frescoes in the Castello Estense and the church of Sant'Andrea of Ferrara, now also lost. His influence was particularly strong in the later Ferrarese allegorical works of Cosimo Tura.

The Baptism of Christ, now in the National Gallery in London, was completed in about 1450 for the high altar of the church of the Priory of S. Giovanni Battista at Sansepolcro. Other notable works are the frescoes of The Resurrection in Sansepolcro, and the Madonna del parto in Monterchi, near Sansepolcro.

Two years later he was in Rimini, working for the condottiero Sigismondo Pandolfo Malatesta. In 1451, during that sojourn, he executed the famous fresco of St. Sigismund and Sigismondo Pandolfo Malatesta in the Tempio Malatestiano, as well as a portrait of Sigismondo. In Rimini, Piero may have met the famous Renaissance mathematician and architect Leon Battista Alberti, who had redesigned the Tempio Malatestiano, although it is known that Alberti directed the execution of his designs for the church by correspondence with his building supervisor. Thereafter Piero was active in Ancona, Pesaro and Bologna.

In 1454, he signed a contract for the Polyptych of Saint Augustine in the church of Sant'Agostino in Sansepolcro. The central panel of this polyptych is lost, and the four panels of the wings, with representations of saints, are now scattered around the world. A few years later, summoned by Pope Nicholas V, he moved to Rome, where he executed frescoes in the Basilica di Santa Maria Maggiore, of which only fragments remain. Two years later he was again in the Papal capital, painting frescoes in the Vatican Palace, which have since been destroyed.

Frescoes in San Francesco at Arezzo
In 1452, Piero della Francesca was called to Arezzo to replace Bicci di Lorenzo in painting the frescoes of the basilica of San Francesco. The work was finished in 1464.
The History of the True Cross cycle of frescoes is generally considered among his masterworks and those of Renaissance painting in general. The story in these frescoes derives from legendary medieval sources as to how timber relics of the True Cross came to be found. These stories were collected in the Golden Legend of Jacopo da Varazze (Jacopo da Varagine) of the mid-13th century.

Piero's activity in Urbino
At some point, Giovanni Santi invited Piero to Urbino. Between 1469 and 1486 Piero worked repeatedly in the service of Count Federico III da Montefeltro (Duke in 1474). The Flagellation is generally considered Piero's oldest work in Urbino (c. 1455–1470). It is one of the most famous and controversial pictures of the early Renaissance. As discussed in its own entry, it is marked by an air of geometric sobriety, in addition to presenting a perplexing enigma as to the nature of the three men standing at the foreground.

Another famous work painted in Urbino is the Double Portrait of Federico and his wife Battista Sforza, in the Uffizi. The portraits in profile take their inspiration from large bronze medals and stucco roundels with the official portraits of Fedederico and his wife. Other paintings made in Urbino are the monumental Montefeltro Altarpiece (1474) in the Brera Gallery in Milan and the Madonna of Senigallia.

In Urbino Piero met the painters Melozzo da Forlì, Fra Carnevale, and the Flemish Justus van Gent, the mathematician Fra Luca Pacioli, the architect Francesco di Giorgio Martini, and probably also Leon Battista Alberti.

Later years
In his later years, painters such as Perugino and Luca Signorelli frequently visited his workshop. He completed the treatise On Perspective in Painting in the mid-1470s to 1480s. By 1480, his vision began to deteriorate, but he continued writing treatises such as Short Book on the Five Regular Solids in 1485. It is documented that Piero rented a house in Rimini in 1482. Piero made his will in 1487 and he died five years later, on 12 October 1492, in his own house in San Sepolcro. He left his possessions to his family and the church.

Criticism and interpretation

Recently, the Frick Collection in New York until 19 May 2013, collected seven of the eight extant paintings of Piero known to exist in the United States for exhibition. Of the seven pieces in the exhibit, critic Jerry Saltz writing in New York magazine singled out Piero's Virgin and Child Enthroned With Four Angels for its exemplary qualities. 

Saltz states that, "The Virgin and child are elevated two steps. They are in a world itself apart from this world apart. Mary isn't looking at her child and looks instead at the rose he reaches for. You begin to glean the revelation she is having. The flower represents love, devotion, and beauty. It also symbolizes blood and the crown of thorns Christ will wear. This child who will suffer a horrendous death reaches for his acceptance of fate. Mary does not pull the flower back. You sense an inner agony, noticing her deep-blue robe open to reveal scarlet beneath, symbol of outward passion and pain to come. In the dead-center vertical line of the painting is Christ's right palm that will be nailed to the cross." 

Saltz accepted this oil painting as the most exceptional work of Piero on display in the exhibit.

Work in mathematics and geometry

Piero's deep interest in the theoretical study of perspective and his contemplative approach to his paintings are apparent in all his work.
In his youth, Piero was trained in mathematics, which most likely was for mercantilism. Three treatises written by Piero have survived to the present day: , De quinque corporibus regularibus (On the Five Regular Solids) and De Prospectiva pingendi (On Perspective in painting). The subjects covered in these writings include arithmetic, algebra, geometry and innovative work in both solid geometry and perspective. Much of Piero's work was later absorbed into the writing of others, notably Luca Pacioli. Piero's work on solid geometry was translated in Pacioli's Divina proportione, a work illustrated by Leonardo da Vinci. Biographers of his patron Federico da Montefeltro of Urbino record that he was encouraged to pursue the interest in perspective which was shared by the Duke.

In the late 1450s, Piero copied and illustrated the following works of Archimedes: On the Sphere and Cylinder, Measurement of a Circle, On Conoids and Spheroids, On Spirals, On the Equilibrium of Planes, The Quadrature of the Parabola, and The Sand Reckoner. The manuscript consists of 82 folio leaves, is held in the collection of the Biblioteca Riccardiana and is a copy of the translation of the Archimedean corpus made by Italian humanist Iacopo da San Cassiano.

Inspirations
Bohuslav Martinů wrote a three movement work for orchestra entitled Les Fresques de Piero della Francesca. Dedicated to Rafael Kubelik, it was premiered by Kubelik and the Vienna Philharmonic at the 1956 Salzburg Festival. 

Piero's geometrical perfection and the almost magic atmosphere of the light in his painting inspired modern painters like Giorgio de Chirico, Massimo Campigli, Felice Casorati, and Balthus.

Selected works

Polyptych of the Misericordia (1445–62) – Tempera and oil on panel, 273 x 330 cm, Museo Civico Sansepolcro
The Baptism of Christ (c. 1448–50) – Tempera on panel, 168 × 116 cm, National Gallery, London
St. Jerome in Penitence (c. 1449–51) – Tempera on panel, 51 × 38 cm, Staatliche Museen, Berlin
St. Jerome and a Donor (Girolamo Amadi) (1451) – Tempera and oil on panel, 49 × 42 cm, Gallerie dell'Accademia, Venice
Sigismondo Pandolfo Malatesta Praying in Front of St. Sigismund (1451) – Fresco (transferred to canvas), 257 x 345 cm, Tempio Malatestiano, Rimini
Portrait of Sigismondo Pandolfo Malatesta (c. 1451) – Tempera and oil on panel, 44.5 × 34.5 cm, Musée du Louvre, Paris
The History of the True Cross (c. 1455–66) – Fresco cycle, Basilica of San Francesco, Arezzo
The Flagellation of Christ (c. 1460) – Tempera on panel, 58.4 x 81.5 cm, Galleria Nazionale delle Marche, Urbino
Polyptych of Saint Augustine (1460–70) – Tempera and oil on panels, dispersed in several museums
Resurrection (c. 1463) –Fresco, 225 × 200 cm, Museo Civico Sansepolcro
Hercules (c. 1465) –Fresco (detached), 151 × 126 cm, Isabella Stewart Gardner Museum, Boston
St. Mary Magdalene (c. 1466, 1458–70s) – Fresco, 190 × 180 cm, Cathedral, Arezzo
Madonna del Parto (1459–67) – Detached fresco, 260 × 203 cm, Chapel of the cemetery, Monterchi
The Nativity (c. 1470) – Oil on panel, 124.5 × 123 cm, National Gallery, London
Polyptych of Saint Anthony (c. 1470) – Oil on panel, 338 × 230 cm, Galleria Nazionale dell'Umbria, Perugia
Brera Madonna, i.e. Montefeltro Altarpiece, (1472–74) – Oil on panel, 248 × 170 cm, Pinacoteca di Brera, Milan
Diptych of the Count and Countess of Urbino, Federico da Montefeltro and Battista Sforza – Oil on panel, each 47,4 × 33,6 cm, Galleria degli Uffizi, Florence.
Madonna di Senigallia (c. 1474) – Oil on panel, 67 × 53.5 cm, Galleria Nazionale delle Marche, Urbino

References
Footnotes

Citations

Sources

Further reading

Berenson, Bernard, Piero della Francesca or The Ineloquent in Art, The Macmillan Company, 1954.
Chieli, Francesca, "La grecità antica e bizantina nell'opera di Piero della Francesca", Firenze, 1993.
Cole, Bruce, Piero della Francesca: Tradition and Innovation in Renaissance Art, HarperCollins Publishers, 1991. .
Damisch, Hubert, Un souvenir d'enfance par Piero della Francesca, Edition du Seuil, Paris, 1997; Engl. ed.: A Childhood Memory by Piero della Francesca, Stanford University Press, 2007. .
Gantz, Jeffrey, "Strong, silent type: Piero della Francesca, international artist of mystery", The Boston Phoenix, Arts section, 1 September 2006.
Ginzburg, Carlo, Indagini su Piero, Eunaudi, Torino, 1982; Engl. ed.: The Enigma of Piero: Piero della Francesca, Verso, 1985, new edition 2002. .
Keim, Frank, Piero della Francesca: Der Maler als Astronom und Physiker (Schriften zur Kunstgeschichte), Hamburg 2016. .
Israëls, Machtelt, Piero della Francesca and the Invention of the Artist, Reaktion Books, 2020. .
Longhi, Roberto, Piero de' Franceschi, Rom, 1927; Engl. ed. translated by Leonard Penlock: Piero della Francesca, F. Warne & Co., London and New York, 1930; new ed. with expansions until 1962, 1963 translation by David Tabbat: Sheep Meadow, 2002. .
Maetzke, Anna Maria; Bertelli, Carlo, eds., Piero della Francesca: The Legend of the True Cross in the Church of San Francesco in Arezzo, Skira, 2001. .
Manescalchi, Roberto, L'Ercole di Piero, tra mito e realtà,(ParteI), Grafica European Center of Fine Art (Terre di Piero), Firenze, 2011. 
Manescalchi, Roberto, "Piero alla corte dei Pichi", in Studi e Documenti Pierfrancescani II, Sansepolcro 2014. 
Pacioli, Luca, Libellus de quinque corporibus regularibus, corredato della versione volgare [fac-sim du Codice Vat. Urb. Lat. 632]; eds. Cecil Grayson,... Marisa Dalai Emiliani, Carlo Maccagni. Firenze, Giunti, 1995.  3 vol. (68 ff., XLIV-213, XXII-223 pp.). 
Piero's Archimedes, [fac-sim du Codice Riccardiano 106 par Piero della Francesca]; eds. Roberto Manescalchi, Matteo Martelli, James Banker, Giovanna Lazzi, Pierdaniele Napolitani, Riccardo Bellè. Sansepolcro, Grafica European Center of Fine Arts e Vimer Industrie Grafiche Italiane, 2007. 2 vol. (82 ff., XIV-332 pp. English, French, Spanish, German, Italian and Arabic). .
Pope-Hennessy, John, The Piero della Francesca Trail, Walter Neurath Memorial Lectures, Thames and Hudson, London, 1991; new ed. expanded with Aldous Huxley, "The Best Picture", The Little Bookroom, 2002. .
 
Tofanelli, Pierpaolo, "La Madonna del Parto", Pagine Nuove di Storia dell'Arte e dell'Architettura N. 3, Firenze, 2009. .
Tofanelli, Pierpaolo, "La Natività", Pagine Nuove di Storia dell'Arte e dell'Architettura N. 4, Firenze, 2010. 
Varisco, Alessio, Borgo Sansepolcro. Città di Cavalieri e Pellegrini, Pessano con Bornago, Mimep-Docete, 2012.

External links
 

 
Italian Renaissance painters
Quattrocento painters
Painters from Tuscany
1415 births
1492 deaths
Artist authors
Geometers
Italian male painters
Mathematical artists
People from Sansepolcro
15th-century people of the Republic of Florence
15th-century Italian mathematicians
15th-century Italian painters
Catholic painters
Renaissance painters